Government College for Women may refer to:
 India
 Government College for Women, Anantnag
 Government College for Women, Baramulla
 Government College for Women, Nawakadal Srinagar
 Government Degree College for Women, Sopore
 Pakistan
 Government College for Women Dhoke Kala Khan